Stomopteryx radicalis is a moth of the family Gelechiidae. It was described by Mark I. Falkovitsh and Oleksiy V. Bidzilya in 2003. It is found in Uzbekistan.

References

Moths described in 2003
Stomopteryx